In Greek mythology, Hippothoe (Ancient Greek: Ἱπποθόη Hippothoê means 'swift as a mare') is the name of five distinct characters.

 Hippothoe, the "lovely" Nereid and one of the 50 marine-nymph daughters of the 'Old Man of the Sea' Nereus and the Oceanid Doris. Her name means running horses (i.e. waves).
Hippothoe, a Libyan princess as one of the Danaïdes, daughters of King Danaus. She married and killed her cousin Obrimus, son of King Aegyptus of Egypt.
Hippothoe, daughter of Mestor, son of Perseus, and of Lysidice, daughter of Pelops. Poseidon abducted Hippothoe from her family and took her to the Echinades islands. There, he sired Taphius who later founded the city of Taphos.
 Hippothoe, one of the Peliades, daughters of Pelias, King of Iolcus. Her mother was either Anaxibia, daughter of Bias, or Phylomache, one of the Niobids.
 Hippothoe, the 'fierce-souled' Amazon who fought with their queen, Penthesilea at Troy. She was killed by Achilles.

Hippothoe is also the scientific name of Lycaena hippothoe, the "Purple-edged Copper" butterfly.

Notes

References 

 Apollodorus, The Library with an English Translation by Sir James George Frazer, F.B.A., F.R.S. in 2 Volumes, Cambridge, MA, Harvard University Press; London, William Heinemann Ltd. 1921. . Online version at the Perseus Digital Library. Greek text available from the same website.
Gaius Julius Hyginus, Fabulae from The Myths of Hyginus translated and edited by Mary Grant. University of Kansas Publications in Humanistic Studies. Online version at the Topos Text Project.
 Hesiod, Theogony from The Homeric Hymns and Homerica with an English Translation by Hugh G. Evelyn-White, Cambridge, MA.,Harvard University Press; London, William Heinemann Ltd. 1914. Online version at the Perseus Digital Library. Greek text available from the same website.
 Kerényi, Carl, The Gods of the Greeks, Thames and Hudson, London, 1951.
 Quintus Smyrnaeus, The Fall of Troy translated by Way. A. S. Loeb Classical Library Volume 19. London: William Heinemann, 1913. Online version at theio.com
 Quintus Smyrnaeus, The Fall of Troy. Arthur S. Way. London: William Heinemann; New York: G.P. Putnam's Sons. 1913. Greek text available at the Perseus Digital Library.
Tzetzes, John Posthomerica translated by Ana Untila.

Nereids
Danaids
Amazons of the Trojan war
Mortal parents of demigods in classical mythology
Princesses in Greek mythology
Characters from Iolcus